Othram (also Othram Inc.) is an American corporation specializing in forensic genealogy to resolve unsolved murders, disappearances, and identification of unidentified decedents or murder victims (colloquially known as John Does and Jane Does). The company also offers law enforcement agencies tools and programs to infer kinship among individuals, both closely and distantly related, through a combination of short tandem repeat (STR) and single nucleotide polymorphism (SNP) testing, as well as forensic genome sequencing of DNA.

Othram has assisted with identifications of cold cases such as Beth Doe, Septic Tank Sam, and Delta Dawn. Many cases are not publicized by the company until after a successful identification.

Othram technology and casework inspired the 500th episode of Law & Order: Special Victims Unit.

Cases

Suspect identifications 
These are cases where Othram has sequenced DNA and returned forensic genetic genealogy leads for the suspect in a violent crime, such as a sexual assault or homicide.

Murder of Carla Walker 

Carla Walker was a 17-year-old girl who was abducted from a bowling alley in Fort Worth, Texas on February 15, 1974. She and her boyfriend, Rodney McCoy, had been sitting in her car outside of the alley after attending a school dance at Western Hills High School when they were attacked by an unknown assailant who pistol whipped Roy, leaving him unconscious. Walker's body was later recovered three days later from a drainage ditch, half an hour south of Fort Worth. She had been beaten, tortured, raped and strangled to death, as well as injected with morphine.

Othram Inc. was contacted in April or May 2020 to use forensic genealogy on DNA left on Walker's body to identify her killer. On September 21, 2020, it was announced that Glen Samuel McCurley, 77 at the time of his arrest, was charged with Walker's murder based on a DNA match.

Murder of Christine Jessop 

Christine Jessop was a 9-year-old girl from Queensville, Ontario, who was abducted after getting off her school bus in October 1984. She went home, dropped off her bag, and planned on meeting with a friend at a nearby park. She never made it to the park. Her body was later recovered on December 31 in a farmer's field in Sunderland, Ontario. She had been raped and stabbed to death, with semen being found on her underwear.

In 2019, the Toronto Police Service contacted Othram to generate a DNA profile from the semen found on Jessop's clothing and perform forensic genealogy to find her killer. After Othram was able to successfully sequence a profile, Toronto Police were able to find her killer in the fall. It was announced on October 15, that Calvin Hoover, a man who died in 2015, matched the profile of DNA and was named as her killer.

Murder of Siobhan McGuinness 
Siobhan McGuinness was a 5-year-old girl from Missoula, Montana, who was abducted in early 1974 while walking to a friend's house. Her body was found two days later in a snowy culvert. She had been raped and stabbed to death. An extensive investigation between law enforcement and the community was made in order to find her killer until all leads were exhausted.

In 2020, the Missoula Police Department, BODE Technology, and the FBI contacted Othram to create a genetic profile from DNA found on the crime scene, after similar techniques were used to identify the Golden State Killer. After a profile was made, the team used forensic genealogy to find Richard William Davis, who was confirmed by DNA to be her killer. Davis had died in 2012.

Murder of Mary Edwards 
Mary Catherine Edwards was a teacher in Beaumont, Texas who was found drowned in her bathroom by her family. It was found that she had been sexually assaulted before being drowned. Traditional DNA testing on evidence left by the killer yielded few leads, all of which were eventually exhausted.

In 2020, the Texas Rangers and Beaumont Police Department contacted Othram to generate a usable genetic profile in order to be used for forensic genealogy to find her killer. The killer was identified in May 2021 as Clayton Foreman, currently incarcerated in Reynoldsburg, Ohio, for unrelated charges. He was extradited to Jefferson County on June 15. Foreman was not initially considered a person of interest in the case, but it was found that he had known her in high school.

Murder of Stephanie Isaacson 
Stephanie Isaacson was a 14-year-old teenage girl who was abducted while walking to Eldorado High School in Las Vegas, Nevada. Her father began to worry after school when she didn't come home, and called the school to find that she had never made it to school in the morning. Her body was later found at a sandlot. She had been sexually assaulted and strangled to death.

In 2021, the Las Vegas Metropolitan Police Department contacted Othram to examine DNA evidence from the scene to help identify Isaacson's killer. Her killer was later identified as Darren Roy Marchand, who had committed suicide in 1995. Notably, the identification and profile was able to be made with only 120 picograms of DNA, making this the lowest amount of DNA ever being able to be used to help solve a crime.

Murder of Alma Jones 
Alma Jones was a 77-year-old woman who was raped and murdered in her home in Raleigh, North Carolina in December 1977. In 2011, a male DNA profile was developed from items located at the crime scene. However, no match had been made in the national database and all leads were exhausted.

In 2021, the Raleigh Police Department contacted Othram to produce a genealogical profile for the unknown male DNA. Her killer was identified as Paul David Crowder Jr., who died in 2015.

Murder of Terrence Paquette 
Terrence Paquette was a 31-year-old convenience store worker at the Lil' Champ Food Store in Orlando, Florida when he was stabbed to death in February 1996. In 2003, the case was re-examined and an unknown male DNA profile was developed from crime scene evidence.

In the fall of 2019, the Orange County Sheriff's Office and the Florida Department of Law Enforcement contacted Othram to use advanced DNA testing on the DNA profile. Kenneth Robert Stough Jr. was eventually identified as the suspect and arrested for first-degree murder in November 2021.

Murder of Candice Rogers 
Candice "Candy" Rogers was a 9-year-old girl who was abducted in Spokane, Washington on March 6, 1959. Candy was a member of the Bluebirds, who were the youngest members of the Camp Fire Girls of America. She was last seen selling mints door-to-door for the organization. Two weeks after her disappearance, her body was found. She had been sexually assaulted and strangled. In the early 2000s, a male DNA profile was extracted from her clothing, but a match wasn't found in the national database.

In February 2021, the Spokane Police Department contacted Othram and requested assistance on the case. In November 2021, her killer was identified as John Reigh Hoff, who had committed suicide in 1970.

Murder of Kim Bryant 
Kim Bryant was a 16-year-old girl who was abducted from a Dairy Queen restaurant in Las Vegas, Nevada on January 26, 1979. Nearly a month later, her body was found in a desert area. She had been sexually assaulted and murdered. An unknown male DNA profile was eventually extracted from crime scene evidence.

In 2021, the Las Vegas Metropolitan Police Department partnered with Othram to generate genealogical leads in the case. In November of that year, it was announced that Johnny Blake Peterson was identified as her killer. Peterson died in January 1993.

Murder of Diana Hanson 
On December 31, 1983 when she was 22, Diana Hanson left her home in Las Vegas, NV and did not return. When her family became concerned, they reported her missing. Her body was found later the same day Spring Mountain Road near Buffalo Drive. Investigators determined that she had been sexually assaulted before her death.

For 38 years, her case remained open but unsolved. Then, after the suspect in the murder of Kim Bryant was identified as Johnny Blake Peterson, investigators requested a direct comparison of DNA recovered from Diana Hanson to that of the now known profile for Peterson. The profiles matched.

Murder of Jawed Ahmed 
Jawed Ahmed, a 32-year-old taxi driver, was found shot to death in his crashed taxi in Anchorage, Alaska on May 28, 1985. Witnesses reported that they had seen a white-skinned man fleeing the crime scene and an officer went after him, but only managed to recover a blood-stained shirt. DNA extracted from this shirt in 2009 concluded that it likely belonged to the killer.

In January 2022, using DNA and blood evidence recovered from the crime scene, Othram identified the suspected killer as a man named Eric Lane Jones, who lived in Idaho. He was subsequently arrested and confessed to the shooting, and is currently awaiting charges for the crime.

Murder of Patricia Barnes
In August 1995, the naked body of 61-year-old Patricia Lorraine Barnes was discovered in a ditch in Olalla, Washington. She had been shot twice in the head, and covered with a sleeping bag. For a long time, she was believed to be a possible victim of serial killer Robert Lee Yates, despite not fitting his usual victims' profile, but he was excluded as a suspect in 2018 when it was confirmed that he was stationed at an army base in Alabama at the time of her murder.

Within months of partnering with the local sheriff's office, Othram built a genealogical profile of the suspect and discovered new leads that eventually led to the identification of Douglas Keith Krohne as Barnes' likely killer. Krohne, who had felony convictions for robbery and kidnapping dating back to the 1980s, could not be arrested as he died after accidentally electrocuting himself in Arizona in 2016.

Murder of Mary Hague Kelly 
On January 19, 1989, 78-year-old Mary Hague Kelly was found strangled to death at her home in Dallas, Texas, found being strapped naked from the waist down and hidden under her bed. Strangely, while several belongings and her car were missing, there were no apparent signs of forced entry. The perpetrator's DNA was extracted in 2004, but authorities were unable to connect it to any suspect.

In November 2021, the Dallas County District Attorney's Office contacted Othram to help, with them developing a genetic profile of the suspect. This eventually led to the identification of 58-year-old David Rojas, who lived next door to Kelly at the time. He is charged with capital murder and awaits trial.

Murder of Stacey Lynn Chahorski AKA "Rising Fawn Jane Doe" 
On December 16, 1988, the remains of a woman were found near a highway in Rising Fawn, Georgia, with indications that she had been strangled. The case remained cold until the GBI contacted Othram, who utilized DNA to identify the decedent as 19-year-old Stacey Chahorksi, a hitchhiker who last contacted her family members in Norton Shores, Michigan in September 1988. On September 6, 2022, Chahorski's killer was identified by Othram as Henry Frederick Wise AKA Hoss Wise. Wise would have been 34 years old at the time of Chahorski's murder. He was a truck driver, traveling the route for Western Carolina trucking company, driving through Chattanooga, Tennessee to Birmingham, Alabama, and finally to Nashville, Tennessee. Wise was also a stunt driver. He had a criminal history in Florida, Georgia, and North Carolina ranging from theft, assault, to obstruction of a police officer. In 1999, Wise was killed in a car accident at Myrtle Beach Speedway in South Carolina and burned to death. Chahorski's case is considered solved.

Rape and attempted murder of a Jane Doe (1984) 
On March 24, 1984, a female resident of Columbia, South Carolina was confronted and sexually assaulted by a stranger on 4000 Wellington Drive. After the assault, the attacker attempted to cut her throat with a knife, damaging her trachea and vocal chords, before leaving her to die in a nearby creek. Miraculously, the victim survived and sought medical assistance, thanks to which she recovered from the assault.

On October 27, 2022, Othram announced that they had identified 59-year-old James Frederick Wilson as the assailant after they matched his DNA to the crime scene. He was later arrested at his home in Mooresville, North Carolina and charged with rape and first-degree assault. Wilson awaits extradition to South Carolina, and investigation is underway to determine whether he has committed other crimes in the area.

Sexual assault of a Jane Doe (1996) 
On August 11, 1996, a 21-year-old resident of Hancock, Maine, was sexually assaulted in her apartment by a perpetrator who broke in. DNA was extracted and a profile of the suspect was developed, with which authorities were able to link him to additional assaults. In November 2022, using said profile, Othram were able to link the 1996 attack to 56-year-old Jason Follette, who now lived in Gouldsboro. He is now charged with sexual assault and awaits trial.

Sexual assault and murders of Susan Tice and Erin Gilmour 
On August 17, 1983, a relative decided to visit 45-year-old Susan Tice, only to find her body in the bedroom of her apartment in Toronto, Ontario. She had been sexually assaulted and stabbed multiple times. On December 20 of that year, the body of 22-year-old Erin Gilmour was also found in her own apartment by a friend - like Tice, she had been sexually assaulted and stabbed multiple times. Despite the fact that the two women had never met each other, the similarity in both killings led authorities to believe that they were committed by the same offender. This theory was conclusively proven in 2000, when DNA linked the two cases to a yet-unidentified male subject.

In 2019, the Toronto Police Service contacted Othram for assistance. With their help, authorities identified 61-year-old Joseph George Sutherland, of Moosonee, as the prime suspect following a press conference held on November 28, 2022. Sutherland lived in the area at the time of the crimes, but moved to northern Ontario shortly after the killings. He is currently charged with two counts of first-degree murder, and investigations are underway to determine whether he has committed any other violent crimes in the province.

Sexual assault and murders of Lori Ann Perera and Pearl Ingram 
On December 11, 1992, the body of 31-year-old Lori Ann Perera was found behind a retail store in Las Vegas, Nevada. Two years later, on January 11, 1994, the body of another woman, 35-year-old Pearl "Pinkie" Wilson Ingram was found inside a dumpster behind a Vons store. Both were sexually assaulted prior to their murders, left completely nude, strangled, and each body was dumped along a stretch on Charleston Boulevard.

Over the years, DNA connected the two murders, and in February 2023, Othram identified the perpetrator as Eddie George Snowden, Jr., who lived on Charleston Boulevard at the time of the crimes. A check of his criminal record showed that he had a rap sheet dating back to the 1950s and lived for most of his life around Fresno, California and the surrounding area. He could not be arrested, as he died from natural causes in 2017. Investigators have indicated that they will be investigating him for connection to any other cold cases.

Sexual assault and murder of Mary Davis 
On May 31, 1987, the body of 29-year-old Mary Mathis Davis was found behind a Winn-Dixie store in Lexington, North Carolina. She had been reported missing the previous day, and was sexually assaulted prior to her death.

In February 2023, Othram used DNA evidence gathered from the crime scene to identify her killer as Russell Grant Wood, an apparent acquaintance of Davis who was never considered a suspect by authorities. He died in 2013, and thus could not be arrested.

Sexual assault and murder of Christina Castiglione 
On March 19, 1983, 19-year-old Christina Lynn Castiglione was reported missing from her hometown of Redford, Michigan, with her body being located two days later near Deerfield Township. She had been sexually assaulted and strangled to death.

In February 2023, Othram announced that after conduting three separate familial DNA tests, they had identified Castiglione's killer as 27-year-old Charles David Shaw. Described as a "mentally disturbed sex addict" who had arrests for attempted abduction and drug possession, he died in November 1983 by accidentally asphyxiating himself during a sexual act.

Sexual assault and murder of Carol Klaber 
On June 5, 1976, the remains of 16-year-old Carol Sue Klaber were discovered in a roadside ditch in Walton, Kentucky. She had been bludgeoned, sexually assaulted and strangled to death. Her case was reopened in 2017 following the formation of a cold case unit, and it was taken up by Othram in September 2022.

In March 2023, Othram identified the killer as Thomas W. Dunaway of Park Hills, Kentucky. At the time of the crime, he was 19 years old and had an extensive criminal history. He died in 1990, and thus could not be arrested.

Murder of a newborn infant (1992) 
On April 15, 1992, the body of a newborn infant was found stuffed inside a trash bag inside a dumpster in Picayune, Mississippi. Coroners determined it had been smothered.

In early 2023, the baby's parents were identified as Andrew Carriere and his wife, Inga Johansen Carriere, both of whom were from Jefferson Parish, Louisiana. Johansen was arrested on February 28 and Carriere on March 9, and both have been charged with first-degree murder.

Murder of Linda Fields 
On February 24, 2000, the body of 37-year-old Linda Fields was found under a tree in Racine, Wisconsin. The perpetrator's DNA was extracted from her body, but when checked with the five initial suspects the authorities held, they were all cleared, leaving the case unsolved.

Othram joined the investigation in May 2021, when analyst Natalie Fischer sent them a sample of the DNA. With this sample, they were able to identify 66-year-old Lucas Alonso of Zion, Illinois as the prime suspect. He admitted to attacking the woman, but claimed that she was still alive when he left. Alonso has been charged with first-degree murder and is awaiting trial.

Unidentified Remains Cases 

These are cases where Othram has sequenced DNA and used forensic genetic genealogy to identify a Jane, John, or Baby Doe.

2020

"Harry" 
On July 18, 1979, the burned skeletal remains of a young white man were found in a farm field in Charleston, Missouri. His cause of death was initially thought to be suspicious, but was eventually ruled an accidental drowning. He was estimated to be between 20 and 60 years old. He also had light brown or dark blonde hair. Height, weight and eye color could not be determined. Various items were found with the remains, but it was not determined if they were related to the decedent. He was also originally thought to have been female. Investigators believe that the remains had ended up at the farm as a result of flooding, and the remains were burned as a result of typical farm activity.

In April 2020, it was announced that he had been identified through efforts by Othram and Redgrave Research. His family requested that his name not be released, but it was shared that he went by the name "Harry", and was in his mid-thirties when he died. An image was later uploaded of "Harry" during life.

Donna Griffin AKA "Bushkill Jane Doe" 

The body of a female between 35 and 55 years old was found in brush on the shoulder of Route 33 in Bushkill Township, Northampton County, Pennsylvania, on October 23, 1987. She was of Caucasian descent and had blue eyes and blond hair. The decedent wore a red shirt with a decal of a woman's face, a multicolored bracelet, jeans and thermal long underwear with a snowflake design. The woman is believed to have died due to a heart attack, yet her face suffered multiple lacerations from an undisclosed cause. She had died within 24 hours of being discovered.

In 2020, the Northampton County District Attorney's Office and BODE Technology, another forensic genealogy company, renewed the investigation of the woman's identity. BODE successfully extracted DNA and sent it to Othram for sequencing. BODE then used forensic genealogy to find potential family members. She was identified in June 2020 as Donna Griffin of Philadelphia, Pennsylvania.

Rodney Johnson AKA "Lake Stickney John Doe" 

On June 11, 1994, the decomposing body of a young to middle-aged man of unknown ethnicity was found floating in Lake Stickney near the public boat launch by a fisherman in Everett, Washington. He had been shot twice in the head. His hair color and eye color could not be ascertained. He was found to have had extensive dental work during his life and had a healed fracture to his left clavicle. He was found wearing a pair of Levis shrink-to-fit jeans, a pair of white Hanes underwater, a pair of black socks, a pair of high-top light brown work boots with string laces and a vulcan sole, and a belt with a metal buckle.

Othram Inc. was contacted to help identify the man. On August 12, 2020, it was announced that he had been identified as Rodney Peter Johnson of Seattle, Washington, who had gone missing in 1987.

Darrell Splett AKA "McHenry County John Doe" 

On May 4, 2019, the body of a middle-aged white man was found by hikers in the Rush Creek Conservation Area in Harvard, Illinois. He was found to have committed suicide. He was found clad in winter clothing, and had been deceased for approximately a year. McHenry County Sherriff's Office attempted to identify the man using typical identification procedures, which yielded no results or leads. A reconstruction was also made by Palm Beach County Sheriff's Forensic Imaging Unit to help aid in identification.

Othram Inc. was contacted in May 2020 to help identify the man. On October 23, 2020, it was announced that he had been identified as Darrell P. Splett of Ingleside, Illinois. He was 50 years old at the time of his death.

Alisha Heinrich AKA "Delta Dawn" 

On December 5, 1982, the body of a female toddler was seen floating in the Escatawpa River beneath a bridge on Interstate 10 in Moss Point, Mississippi. She had reportedly been seen a few days earlier with her mother, then-unidentified Gwendolyn Clemmons, as Clemmons paced the bridge, seemingly distressed. Drivers reported seeing Clemmons' body floating in the river, but when law enforcement conducted a search, they instead found Heinrich, deceased. During subsequent searches, another man was recovered, however he was found to be unrelated to the case. Clemmons has not been found, and is believed to be deceased.

Othram was contacted by the Jackson County Sheriff's Office in 2019 to create a genetic profile for genetic genealogy. After the profile was developed, the Sheriff's Office and FBI worked together and were able to identify Heinrich in September 2020. On December 4, 2020, it was announced that "Delta Dawn" had been identified as Alisha Ann Heinrich, last seen with her mother in Kansas City, Missouri.

2021

Vance Rodriguez AKA "Mostly Harmless" 

On July 23, 2018, a hiker was found dead in his tent near the Appalachian Trail in Big Cypress National Preserve in Florida; he appeared to have starved to death. He had graying dark brown hair, an unkempt gray and brown beard, and blue eyes. He also appeared to have a faint scar across his abdomen. Rodriguez was found wearing a beige shirt with neon green and gray accents, gray "Russel" brand shorts, "Performance" brand underwear, and a Columbia baseball cap. He was also found with various camping and hiking items. He had been seen alive various times previously, and went by the names "Mostly Harmless", "Ben Bilemy", and "Denim" to those he met, possibly referencing Douglas Adams' Hitchhiker's Guide to the Galaxy.

Othram Inc. was contacted in July 2020 to help identify "Mostly Harmless". On January 12, 2021, it was announced that "Mostly Harmless" had been identified as Vance John Rodriguez of Lafayette Parish, Louisiana, who had moved to Brooklyn, New York after he was recognized by a former co-worker after seeing a flyer.

Jolaine Hemmy AKA "Pecos Jane Doe" 
On July 5, 1966, a young man and woman checked into the Ropers Motel in Pecos County, Texas, using the name "Mr. and Mrs. Russell Battuon" (or "Batuon")". Two hours after checking in, the motel staff heard a scream and checked the pool area, finding the woman floating in the pool after she had drowned. There were no signs of foul play and she appeared to be alone when she died. Meanwhile, the man had been sleeping; after helping the staff retrieve his companion's body, he quickly left the hotel without paying his bill, taking nearly all belongings and the registration card that he had used to check in.

Investigators could not find the man after he left, and it was found out that he had told motel staff that he needed the registration card to confirm his stay at the motel for hospital staff, since they were not from the area, but had never arrived at the hospital. He was described as being around 25 years old, with a short slender build and blonde hair, and drove a late model 1963 sedan. The only charges he could have faced would have been a result of "defrauding" the motel, which investigators believe he may have done "out of fear".

She had long brown hair and large brown eyes. She had an olive complexion, which caused investigators to believe she was of Italian or Latin descent. She also had a burn scar on the right side of her rib cage. She was wearing a bright red swimsuit when she died, but she was observed earlier to be wearing dark shorts, a bra, and a flowered blouse, all of which happened to have been the only things left behind in their room by the man when he left. Her fingerprints were taken but did not match anybody in the FBI database.

She was later buried in a donated casket in Fairview Cemetery, with a donated headstone. An anonymous mourner occasionally placed flowers on her grave and kept the site well maintained. Many tips were submitted regarding her identity, but none have proved fruitful.

She would later undergo forensic DNA sequencing by Othram Inc.

The decedent was confirmed to be 17-year-old Jolaine Hemmy, formerly of Salina, Kansas in January 2021.

James St. Peters AKA "Montgomery John Doe" 
On October 7, 2016, the remains of a middle-aged or elderly white or Hispanic man were recovered from a reservoir in The Woodlands, Texas. He had gray or white hair and possibly greenish eyes. He was found wearing a green long-sleeved shirt, a pair of blue pants, a dark belt, a single black shoe with Velcro straps, a green backpack, a Swiss army knife and a dog tag with the name "Phillip H. Williams" and a ship design.

In late 2020, Othram Inc. was contacted to help identify the man. On February 11, 2021, it was announced that he had been identified as James Edwards St. Peters.

Lisa Todd AKA "Publicker Girl" 

On January 24, 1988, the skeletal remains of a young white female were discovered by a man walking his dog in a pump house at the old 'Publicker' distillery in Bensalem, Pennsylvania. She was estimated to be between 16 and 30 years old, between 5 feet and 5 feet 3 inches tall, and weighed between 100 and 120 pounds. She also had brown hair and appeared to be about six months pregnant. Eye color could not be ascertained. She was found wearing 'Braxton' designer jeans, a purple lace camisole, open-toed platform shoes, a black bodysuit top, an oval sterling silver ring with five clear stones and five stones missing, and a silver-colored ring with a belt-and-buckle design. Various other clothing items were found with the remains, however, investigators could not determine if they belonged to the victim. When investigators found the body in the pump house, they had to pump 8 inches of water and oil fuel out of the house in order to retrieve the remains. The location had become a well-known place for the illegal dumping of stolen vehicles. Flyers of a reconstruction and dental records were distributed, which generated 50 leads of missing person reports which matched the victim, however, all of these came up negative.

On March 9, 2021, it was announced that she had been identified by Othram Inc. and Bode Technology as Lisa Todd of Philadelphia, Pennsylvania.

Shawna Garber AKA "Grace Doe" 
On December 2, 1990, the decomposing remains of a young white or possibly Native American woman were found in McDonald County, Missouri, tied with several different types of rope, indicating that she was likely the victim of a sexual assault. She was estimated to be between 21 and 31 years old, was between 5 feet 1 inch and 5 feet 4 inches tall and weighed 120 pounds. She had wavy, collar length dark brown hair with naturally red highlights. She was found wearing a stone-washed Levi jacket, a white T-shirt, a pair of Lee blue jeans, a pair of socks, and white 'Fitness' brand hi-top sneakers.

Othram Inc. took up her case, and Garber was subsequently identified in March 2021.

Evelyn Colon AKA "Beth Doe" 

On December 20, 1976, the dismembered body of a young white or Hispanic female was found in multiple suitcases beneath a highway bridge in White Haven, Pennsylvania. Investigators were unable to identify her and she was buried under the name "Beth Doe". After 44 years, investigators finally got a break in the case in 2020 when they compared her DNA to genealogy databases and identified Luis Colon Jr. as a relative of the deceased. Colon Jr. and his family told investigators that Colon Jr.'s aunt, Evelyn Colon, disappeared from Jersey City, New Jersey at the age of 15 in December 1976 and that she was pregnant and in an abusive relationship at the time she disappeared.

In 2020, the Pennsylvania State Police and the NCMEC contacted Othram to sequence an extraction of DNA in order for them to use forensic genealogy. On March 31, 2021, investigators publicly announced that Beth Doe had been identified as Evelyn Colon. Luis Sierra, Colon's boyfriend and the father of her child, was arrested for her murder.

Missy Poitra AKA "Durham Jane Doe" 

On October 22, 2016, investigators found the skeletal remains of a woman in a plastic container in a storage unit in Durham, North Carolina. Investigators found her death suspicious, and believe she had been in the container since at least 2010. They were only able to glean a few details concerning her identity or how she ended up in the container.

In 2020, Othram reached out to the Durham Police Department to help assist with identifying the woman. They were able to find some distant relatives and gave the information to the police department, who were able to identify her in May 2021 as Missy Ann Poitra, who had gone missing in 2005.

Pamela Duffy and William "Digger" Lane AKA "San Bernardino County Jane and John Doe (1980)" 

On November 17, 1980, the remains of a young man and young woman were found in a shallow grave in the desert near now former US Route 66, approximately 5 miles east of Ludlow, California. Both had died from gunshot wounds and blunt force trauma.

She had a "highly distinctive" smile with several gaps in her teeth, and her left ear was pierced. She had a 10-karat ring with 7 glass stones, the middle of which was missing.

He had long brown hair, a pierced ear, and a tattoo of an Egyptian Ankh. His weight and eye color could not be determined. He was found with a white-metal Ankh earring in his left ear.

In 2017, investigators accused convicted murderer Howard Neal, who had been living in Ludlow at the time, of their deaths. Eventually Neal confessed to the murders, but claimed he didn't know who the pair was.

Othram was later contacted by the San Bernardino County Sheriff's Department and Barbara Rae-Venter to create a usable DNA profile to help identify the pair. In December 2020, the pair was identified as Pamela Dianne Duffy and William "Digger" Everette Lane, with an announcement being made in April 2021.

Janet Lucas AKA "Christy Crystal Creek" 

On September 9, 1985, the skeleton of a young woman, nicknamed "Christy Crystal Creek," was found with two .32 caliber bullets in her skull. No clothing was located at the crime scene. Investigators believed this individual may have died sometime between 1983 and early 1985. Examination indicated that she had a history of smoking and had many fillings as well as two root canals. She also had a type of oral surgery which is distinct to Asia's dental techniques, involving the screwing of a dental post into the tooth. Along with other physical characteristics, it was previously thought she was possibly of Asian descent. It is possible that serial killer and rapist Wayne Nance was responsible for her murder; due to his death in 1986, he was never tried or convicted of any murder. Two other victims believed to have been killed by Nance are "Debbie Deer Creek" and "Betty Beavertail," later identified as Marcella Bachmann and Devonna Nelson, respectively. He also may have committed the murders of two others prior to the Jane Doe discoveries.

Lucas was identified in May 2021 with assistance from Othram. She was last seen in Idaho in 1983 and was originally from Spokane, Washington.

Kimberly Funk AKA "Vancleave Jane Doe" 

On February 1, 1991, the skeletal remains of a white woman were found by hunters in Vancleave, Mississippi. The cause of death was not determined but believed to be a homicide. Hair color and eye color could not be ascertained. She was found wearing a bathing suit, and various pieces of jewelry of unknown description were found at the scene. Investigators believed she may have been from out of state.

Her case file was destroyed at some point, making various details about her case unknown, including the recovery location and date. Despite the setbacks, she was identified in June 2021 as Kimberly Funk of Mississippi with assistance from Othram.

Nathan Hine AKA "Lake Laberge John Doe" 
On May 9, 2016, the body of a young to middle-aged man of unknown ethnicity was found near the eastern side of Lake Laberge near Whitehorse, Yukon. Weight, hair color, and eye color could not be ascertained. He was described as having crowded teeth and was found wearing a black jacket, a pair of ivory, gray, or cream-colored long underwear, a brown and green camo "CLC" brand glove, a pair of black leather "Dakota" brand steel-toed work boots, and a black belt with a knife sheath attached.

Othram was contacted by the Royal Canadian Mounted Police and Yukon Coroner Service in 2020 to aid with the investigation. In June 2021, it was announced that he had been identified as Nathan Eugene Hine of Yukon.

Gordon "Gordie" Sanderson AKA "Septic Tank Sam" 

On April 13, 1977, the decomposing remains of a young to middle aged Native American or white man were found by residents searching a 1.8 meter-deep septic tank in Tofield, Alberta. He had been shot several times and had been sexually mutilated and tortured beforehand, including being burned with a blowtorch and cigarette lighters. Investigators think that the killer must have been familiar with the area, due to the property being derelict and in a very rural location. He was estimated to be between 26 and 50 years old, was 168 cm tall and weighed 70 kilograms. He had brown hair and notable recent dental work. He was found wearing a Levi work shirt with snap buttons, a gray T-shirt, a pair of jeans, a pair of gray wool socks and a pair of brown imitation 'Wallabee' shoes.

Othram was contacted by the Alberta RCMP and Office of the Chief Medical Examiner in 2020 to develop new leads on his identity or killer. With the new genetic profile, "Septic Tank Sam" was identified in June 2021 as Gordon "Gordie" Edwin Sanderson of Edmonton, Alberta.

Steven Knox AKA "Snohomish Jetty Doe" 

On June 20, 1980, the decomposed body of a young to middle-aged white man was found in the Snohomish River near the old Weyerhaeuser Mill and Dagmar Marina in Everett, Washington. Authorities determined he had likely died as the result of an accidental drowning. He appeared to have brown hair and teeth in good condition. He was found wearing a tan button-up short-sleeved shirt, a possibly white knit T-shirt, a blue swimsuit with white stripes, and a pair of tan "Big Mac" brand overalls.

On August 4, 2021, it was announced that he had been identified as Steven Lee Knox with assistance from Othram.

Michael Kirov AKA "Dave" 
On July 28, 1995, a man was witnessed by Canadian Pacific Railway employees jumping up from a ditch on the side of a railroad line in front of an oncoming train in Regina, Saskatchewan. The train's driver blew the whistle and he stepped aside, only to seemingly change his mind and step back in front of the train. The train was unable to stop in time and the man was killed instantly, ruled as a suicide.

He had well-groomed short brown hair and blue eyes. He was found wearing a blue denim button-up shirt with a gold crown logo on the left front pocket, a grey T-shirt with "Boca Authentic" on the front, faded jeans, white socks, a pair of blue and white Reebok hi-top basketball sneakers, a silver rose brooch, and a knapsack with clothing and personal items.

A witness claimed to have been travelling with the decedent from Alberta to Regina. He described the man as well mannered and well groomed, and that his name may have been "Brian", and that he was from Ontario, although other sources state that he called himself "Dave". He did not seem very street savvy, and did not appear to be a drifter. He had enjoyed discussing politics and reading Stephen King novels, and constantly wrote in a diary, which was never found. He may have recently broken up with a girlfriend by the name of "Kathy".

After leads were exhausted, Othram was contacted in December 2020 to generate new leads based on DNA. After they returned their findings, Regina Police Service was able to continue their investigation and identified the unknown man as Michael Kirov of Winnipeg, Manitoba, in mid-August 2021.

David Milek AKA "Granite County John Doe" 
On August 11, 2014, the remains of a young to middle aged white man were found near Bidwell Gulch at the Welcome Creek Wilderness Area in Philipsburg, Montana. He was believed to possibly be a backpacker or camper, reflected by the items he was found with. He was estimated to be between 23 and 57 years old, was 6 feet tall and weighed 140 pounds. Hair color and eye color could not be determined. He was found wearing a pair of jeans and leather boots. Items found with him included a 'Coleman' brand sleeping bag sack, a knife, and a can of bear spray.

Othram was contacted in April 2021 to help identify the man. He was identified in September 2021 as David John Milek of Dallas, Texas.

Theodore Kampf AKA "Dawson City John Doe" 
On May 21, 1983, the remains of a young to middle-aged white man were found near the North Fork Dam in Dawson City, Yukon. His cause of death was unknown, but authorities believed his manner of death was homicide. He was found wearing dark blue denim pants, a size 36 belt, white cotton underwear, and white cotton socks. Due to his clothing, he was believed to be American.

Othram was contacted by the Yukon RCMP Historical Case Unit and Yukon Coroner Service in 2019 to assist in identifying the victim. On September 14, 2021, his identity was announced as 46-year-old Theodore Frederick Kampf, an American citizen who had traveled from Oaklyn, New Jersey to the Yukon in July 1981. Investigators now believe that he was murdered that same month.

Margaret Fetterolf AKA "Woodlawn Jane Doe" 

On September 12, 1976, the body of a young woman was found partially wrapped in a white sheet near a cemetery in Woodlawn, Baltimore County, Maryland. She had been beaten, strangled, and raped. The rape had caused bleeding that had seeped into her clothing. Investigators speculated that she was murdered at a different location and then left at the scene at which she was found. It was estimated that she was between 15 and 30 years old, 149 and 159 pounds, and 5 feet 6 to 5 feet 9 inches tall. She was found wearing a white and tan shirt, a white bra, and knee-high socks with multi-colored stripes.

Othram was contacted by BODE Technology and Baltimore County Police in February 2021 to produce a comprehensive genealogical profile from DNA extracted from the victim. On September 15, 2021, it was announced that she had been identified as 16-year-old Margaret Fetterolf of Alexandria, Virginia.

Marlene Standridge AKA "Gwinnett County Jane Doe" 
On December 9, 1982, a female skull was found in the woods in unincorporated Stone Mountain, Gwinnett County, Georgia. At the time, it was believed that the remains were at the location for 6 to 10 years. The victim was initially thought to be black and between 18 and 30 years old.

Othram was contacted by the Gwinnett Homicide Unit in March 2021 to generate a DNA profile from the skull. DNA analysis determined the victim was white, not black like previously believed. On September 16, 2021, the victim was identified as Marlene Standridge, who had disappeared in the early 1970s. Law enforcement is currently investigating her murder.

Clara Birdlong AKA "Escatawpa Jane Doe" 

On December 27, 1977, skeletal human remains were found in Escatawpa, Mississippi. The victim was determined to be an African American woman with a front gold tooth. She possibly wore a wig. It is estimated that the woman might have died 3 to 4 months before she was found.

In 2018, serial killer Samuel Little confessed to numerous murders, including the murder of Escatawpa Jane Doe. Little said he murdered a woman that he met at a bar in Gulfport and that she was possibly from the Pascagoula area. Investigators confirmed that he was arrested in Pascagoula in August 1977 during the time period the victim was estimated to have died. He died in prison in December 2020.

The Jackson County Sheriff's Office, in cooperation with the Mississippi State Crime Lab, reached out to Othram to use advanced DNA testing to identify the victim. On September 21, 2021, it was announced that she had been identified as 44-year-old Clara Birdlong from Leflore County, Mississippi.

Kyle Martin AKA "Palisades Pete" 
On September 16, 2002, a skull and several bones were found at the Palisades Reservoir between Big Elk and Blowout Canyon in Bonneville County, Idaho. The remains were determined to belong to a male of an undetermined race that was approximately 25 to 45 years old.

Othram teamed up with the Bonneville County Sheriff's Office and Southeast Missouri State University in March 2021 to identify the remains. On September 23, 2021, the remains were identified as 24-year-old Kyle Martin of Jackson, Wyoming. He disappeared while kayaking in the Hoback River on June 1, 1995, and it is believed that he drowned.

Anderson Bolls AKA "Hinds County John Doe" 
On August 27, 2020, the skeletal remains of a man were discovered in a wooded area in Hinds County, Mississippi. He was found wearing khaki pants, white athletic shoes, and a dark colored jacket.

Othram partnered with the Mississippi State Crime Lab to generate his genealogical profile. On September 30, 2021, he was identified as 55-year-old Anderson Bolls of Jackson, Mississippi, who had been missing since April 1, 2020.

Janet Robinson AKA "Fort Sumter Jane Doe" 
On October 25, 2020, a right foot wearing a sneaker was discovered on a beach near Fort Sumter, Charleston, South Carolina. The victim's left foot was found on March 17, 2021.

Othram received evidence from the Charleston County Coroner's Office in June 2021 to produce leads on the victim's identity. On October 6, 2021, the remains were identified as 57-year-old Janet Robinson, who was originally from Mississippi.

Timothy Gomez AKA "Gardendale John Doe" 
On September 10, 2019, a skull and other remains were found on a ranch in Gardendale, Texas. The remains were determined to be from a male and it was estimated that death may have occurred 2 to 5 years prior to discovery. Items found near the victim included an Adidas shoe, pants, a reversible belt, a 2002 Audi flip key fob, and a black hair tie.

Othram was contacted by the Ector County Sheriff's Office and the Texas Rangers in February 2021 to produce a genealogical profile of the victim. On October 14, 2021, he was identified as Timothy Daniel Gomez.

"Nags Head Baby Doe" 
On April 4, 1991, the decomposed remains of an infant were found under a trash can in Nags Head, North Carolina. Due to advanced decomposition, gender was unable to be determined. The medical examiner ruled that the cause of death was blunt force trauma and asphyxiation.

Othram was contacted by the Nags Head Police Department to identify the victim, who was eventually determined to be a boy via DNA analysis. On October 25, 2021, it was announced that he was identified as the child of Scott Gordon Poole, and his wife, Robin Lynn Byrum of Taylorsville, North Carolina. The couple was arrested for their involvement in his death.

George Seitz AKA "Queens John Doe" 

On March 12, 2019, the dismembered partial remains of a man were discovered in the backyard of a home in Queens, New York City after a woman contacted police and informed them that she had seen her stepfather burying a body when she was a child in the 1970s. However, she did not know the identity of the victim.

Othram partnered with the Queens District Attorney's Office and the NYC FBI to identify the victim. On November 3, 2021, it was announced that he had been identified as 81-year-old George Clarence Seitz, who disappeared after leaving his home to get a haircut on December 10, 1976. Seitz was a World War I veteran. Martin Motta was arrested and indicted by a grand jury for the murder.

Sherri Jarvis AKA "Walker County Jane Doe" 

On November 1, 1980, the body of a teenage girl was found along Interstate 45 near Huntsville, Texas, having been beaten severely and strangled. 14-year-old Sherri Ann Jarvis had been in the custody of the state of Minnesota, after excessive truancy from school, until she ran away and disappeared at age 14. It is not known how she made her way to Texas, but three witnesses in the area described her as saying she wanted to go to the now-defunct Ellis Prison Farm to see a "friend". The connection Sherri may have had to the Ellis Prison Farm has never been discovered.

She was publicly identified on November 9, 2021, with assistance from Othram, Inc. The company had begun work on the case during the summer of 2020, finding a potential match in March 2021. Further investigation led to the victim's positive identification.

Aaron McGraw AKA "Moss Point John Doe" 
On October 25, 2016, skeletal remains were found in a wooded area in Moss Point, Mississippi. It was determined that the remains belonged to a man who was likely Caucasian and between 30 and 50 years old.

Othram partnered with the Mississippi State Crime Lab and the Jackson County Sheriff's Office to identify the man. On November 15, 2021, he was identified as Aaron McGraw. Aaron was reported missing in May 2015 and had a history of mental illness. Foul play isn't suspected in his death.

Michael Allison Beavers AKA "Fire Island John Doe" 
In 1989, human remains were found on the northwest shore of Fire Island off the coast of Alaska. It was determined that they were of a homicide victim who was Caucasian and between 30 and 50 years of age.

Othram worked with the Alaska Bureau of Investigation (ABI) Cold Case Investigation Unit (CCIU) to identify the man. On December 1, 2021, he was identified as Michael Allison Beavers. Michael was reported missing in January 1980. He last had contact with his family in November 1979.

Roland D. Klug AKA "Winnebago County John Doe (2015)" 
In 2015, human remains were found along the railroad tracks outside of Vinland, Wisconsin. He was tested using the CODIS system, but there were no matches.

In 2021, Othram worked with the Winnebago County Sheriff's Office, the Winnebago County Coroner's Office, and Dr. Jordan Karsten, professor UW-Oshkosh to identify the man as Roland D. Klug. He was born 1949 and was from Oshkosh.

Edward Evans AKA “Northampton John Doe (1995)”
In December 1995, a group found a skull along the bank of the Roanoke River in the Garysburg area of North Carolina. They reported it to law enforcement, and investigators searched the area. They found a nearly intact skeleton and clothing under a light covering of soil and leaves.

In 2021, Othram worked with the Northampton County Sheriff's Office to DNA sequence the remains and provide forensic genetic genealogy research. He was identified as Edward Evans born in 1906. He was last seen by his family in 1982.

Xin Rong AKA "Saginaw County John Doe"
On September 9, 2018, the owner of a wooded piece of land in Chapin Township, Michigan, was checking game cameras and discovered the remains of an unidentified man. The unidentified man had been fully skeletonized by the time he was discovered, suggesting a time of death at around 1–5 years prior to discovery. An autopsy confirmed that the cause of death was severe blunt force trauma. The state of decomposition made it difficult to confirm the man's physical attributes, but pathologists were able to determine that the man was likely an adult male between the ages of 25 and 55, who stood at around 5’10 feet tall. There was no definitive assessment of biogeographical ancestry. The unknown man was fully clothed and had black Sketchers work boots, a 32-inch Calvin Klein belt, and a Boston Trader’s sweatshirt.

On December 16, 2021, he was identified as 27-year-old Xin Rong, a doctoral student at the University of Michigan and licensed pilot whose rented plane was found crashed in Canada in 2017, but his body was not found. While it was supposed that he might have jumped off, he was declared legally dead in October 2017.

It has been determined he had committed suicide by jumping from a Cessna he had been renting since 2015. He departed from Ann Arbor Airport, his flight plan listed his intended destination as Harbor Springs Municipal Airport, however the plane crashed in Manitouwadge, Ontario when it ran out of fuel.

2022

Patricia Cavallaro AKA "Riverside County Jane Doe"
On October 24, 1994, an unidentified woman was found buried in a shallow grave near Thousand Palms, California. The investigation suggested that the woman was a homicide victim. At the time of discovery, the Coroner's Office used all available resources to identify the victim, including having her DNA profile entered into the California Department of Justice Missing and Unidentified Persons System, but no identification was able to be made. With conventional STR testing not producing leads and other leads and tips exhausted, the case soon went cold.

On January 3, 2022, she was identified as 57-year-old Patricia Cavallaro of Bellflower, California, thanks to a DNA sample provided by one of her surviving children. Detectives suspect that she had been killed elsewhere and then dumped in the desert, and are continuing to investigate her murder.

Donald Rindahl AKA "Isanti County John Doe"
In August 2003, skeletal remains were found in the area of Highway 47 and County Road 5 in Bradford Township, Minnesota. The remains were discovered during an excavation project by a land owner. It was believed the body was that of a Caucasian male, 20–28 years old and had been buried for 3 to 28 years. The Minnesota Bureau of Criminal Apprehension (BCA) obtained a DNA profile and dental records which were entered into missing person databases. A facial reconstruction was also commissioned to generate clues to the unidentified person's identity.

In January 2022, the decedent was identified as 22-year-old Donald Rindahl of New Brighton, who disappeared in the early 1970s. Rindahl, who had been sought after by the FBI due to his involvement with illicit drugs, is suspected to have been murdered, but his official cause of death is currently undetermined.

Jean Turner Ponders AKA "Lincoln Jane Doe"
In May 2012, a Talladega County Sheriff's Office deputy was patrolling rural Allred Road in Lincoln, Alabama. He noticed the front door of a vacant home was wide open and decided to investigate. When he searched the backyard of the property, he discovered the human remains of an unknown woman. Her body was found less than five miles from the Talladega Superspeedway, a NASCAR racetrack that holds several major race events each year. At the time she was discovered, the Superspeedway was holding a multi-day race event with thousands in attendance. Investigators were not able to determine if the woman and her death were connected in any way to the events held that weekend.

Investigators estimated that the woman was white and between 45 and 65 years old. She was found wearing a royal blue shirt, dark blue sweatpants, and off-white shoes. She had sandy brown hair that was graying and wore dentures engraved with the name "Powders." The state forensics department found that she likely had lung cancer. There was no identifying documents found at the scene and the remains were too decomposed to collect fingerprints. The case was entered into NCIC and NamUs in August 2012. Her description did not match any local missing persons cases and with all leads exhausted, the case soon went cold.

In January 2022, Othram, using DNA extracted from the body after an autopsy, identified the decedent as 67-year-old Jean Turner Ponders of Roswell, Georgia. Her death is not considered suspicious, although authorities are still trying to determine what brought her to the abandoned house.

Franklin D. Feldman AKA "Bethlehem John Doe"
In April 1981, the Bethlehem Police Department responded to a wooded area at the property line between the Vadney Farm and the Elm Avenue Town Park in Delmar, New York after a farmer discovered the remains of an adult man. There was no identification on the deceased individual. The Bethlehem Police Department began an investigation and followed up on all leads for several years before all leads were exhausted. In 2013, the Bethlehem Police Department re-opened the investigation into this case and undertook efforts to identify the deceased man. Through the course of this investigation police were able to locate the mandible and maxilla of the deceased at a dentist office in Saratoga County. The previous dentist at this location had been involved in working to identify the decedent back in 1981. The mandible and maxilla were examined with the assistance of a Forensic Odontologist from the New York State Police, and found to be those of the deceased from 1981. These bones were then submitted to the New York State Police Lab, New York City Office of the Chief Medical Examiner and the University of Texas Center for Human Identification in efforts to develop a DNA profile of the deceased.

In January 2022, the man was identified as 41-year-old Franklin D. Feldman, a transient originally from Massachusetts. The match was made through familial DNA provided by a family member. While his death is not considered suspicious, it is unclear how exactly Feldman died.

Timothy Mangum AKA "Stafford County John Doe (1990)"
On September 28, 1990, a homeowner cleaning a field in Stafford County, Virginia found what appeared to be a human skull. DNA testing concluded that the skull belonged to a male aged between 15 and 18 years, and who had likely died a year to three years prior.

In February 2022, Othram identified the decedent as Timothy Alan Mangum, a resident of Norfolk who was last seen alive in 1983–1984. As he had not kept in contact with his family, it is unclear what led up to and caused his death. Anyone who might have information regarding Mangum's activities is encouraged to contact the county sheriff's office.

Charles Wane Dodd "Montgomery County John Doe"
In 1988, a hunter found suspected human skeletal remains while hunting in Montgomery County, Texas. The skeletal remains were taken to a dentist for examination, who determined they were human remains; further analysis determined them to be the remains of an older human male.

In February 2022, Othram identified the remains as Charles Wane Dodd of Dallas, Texas. Dodd was reported missing in 1985, 3 years before the remains were found; he would have been 74 years old at the time of his death. An investigation into the circumstances of his death continues.

Ronald David Chambers AKA "Stanwood Bryant Doe"
On August 3, 1980, a human skull and bones, the former bearing a gunshot wound to the back, were found on private property in Arlington, Washington. Little was known about the decedent and the case remained cold until the grave was exhumed in 2011 for further research.

In February 2022, Othram identified the remains as belonging to 28-year-old Ronald David Chambers, who was last seen leaving a motel in SeaTac in the company of his friend Robert "Bob" Helberg on December 17, 1978. Helberg, a self-professed hitman who was considered a suspect in Chambers' disappearance and several murders, died in a federal prison in California in 1993, but authorities continue to seek information about his activities from  1978 to 1985.

Richard Wayne Guarro AKA "Tortoise Reserve Doe"
On July 7, 2001, the remains of a man were found approximately five miles off the I-15 highway near Las Vegas, Nevada. Coroners concluded that the victim had been killed, but were unable to establish how exactly he was killed or who had done it at the time.

In March 2022, Othram identified the man as 39-year-old Richard Wayne Guarro using DNA provided by his sister. He was last seen alive during a trip to Las Vegas on November 18, 1996, but vanished soon after. Investigators are now seeking information that could lead to his killer.

Sharon Lee Gallegos AKA "Little Miss Nobody"  

The partially buried body of a female child was found in Sand Wash Creek Bed on Old Alamo Road in Congress, Arizona on July 31, 1960. Her cause of death was never determined by medical examiners, but her case was officially declared to be a homicide. She became known as "Little Miss Nobody" after no family or friends came forward to either report her missing or to claim her body. In March 2022, local authorities, with the help of Othram, announced her identity. Gallegos was last seen on 21 July 1960, when she was abducted as she was in an alley behind her home.

Gary Simpson AKA "Moss Point John Doe (1982)" 
The skeletal remains of a young man were found beneath the eastbound I-10 bridge spanning the Escatawpa River in Moss Point, Mississippi on December 8, 1982. His remains were located only about 60 yards from where the body of Alisha Heinrich was found, however investigators ruled out a connection. This John Doe was estimated to have been in his late teens to early 20's when he died around six months to 3 years prior to Heinrich. In March 2022, local authorities, with the assistance of Othram, identified him as Gary Simpson. Simpson was born in 1962 and was from Louisiana. Investigators continue to investigate the circumstances that led up to Simpson's murder and how he ended up in Mississippi.

Roger Brian Bennett AKA "Mr. Bones" 
On September 19, 1984, deputies from the sheriff's office in Grangeville, Idaho were dispatched to investigate an abandoned campsite they had explored the year prior, after a local reported finding a human skeleton there. While there were numerous personal items in the area, there was no identification. Over the years, authorities made several attempts to identify the decedent, including constructing several different clay composites, but the case remained cold.

In April 2022, using DNA extracted from a previous exhumation, Othram identified the man as Roger Brian Bennett. He was last heard of when he contacted his family in Oklahoma in early 1982 to inform them that he had been discharged from Keesler Air Force Base and was on his way to Houma, Louisiana to search for work at an oil rig. His cause of death is unclear, and is under investigation.

Brenda Sue Black AKA "Will County Jane Doe" 
On April 19, 1981, the partial skeletal remains of a woman was found off the I-80 near New Lenox, Illinois. No clothing was found at the scene, and there were indications that the body might have been transported to the crime scene after death.

In April 2022, the decedent was identified as Brenda Sue Black, who was last seen on January 1, 1980 in Vandalia, Ohio, while supposedly en route to an unspecified location in California. Investigation into her cause of death is ongoing.

Margaret Ann "Maggie" Sniegowski, Jr. AKA "Boone County Jane Doe" 
On May 3, 1992, the unidentified remains of a woman were found off the I-65, near Lebanon, Indiana by a farmer. Little could be ascertained as to her cause of death, but authorities at the time suspected it was homicidal in nature.

On April 13, 2022, the woman was identified as 17-year-old Maggie Sniegowski, who was originally from Toledo, Ohio. Research into her potential murder is ongoing.

David E. Reed AKA "Meridian John Doe" 
In May 2018, the skeletal remains of an adult male were found scattered in a wooded area near 145 U.S. Route 80 near Meridian, Mississippi. This body was estimated to have been between 5'3 and 6'1 in length. There were no identification documents found with the man and he left behind almost no clues as to who he might've been.

In 2021, the Mississippi State Medical Examiner's Office along with the Mississippi Bureau of Investigation partnered with Othram to use genetic genealogy to help identify the man. Skeletal remains were sent to Othram's lab where DNA was extracted and a genealogical profile of the man was built. Carla Davis, a Mississippi native and philanthropist, provided funding and performed the genealogical research for the team. On April 21, 2022, the man was identified as David E. Reed, a U.S Navy veteran who was born in 1951. Research into his death is ongoing.

Dean Jeffrey AKA "D'iberville John Doe"  
In April 2020, the body of a man was found in D'iberville, Mississippi, behind 3680 Sangani Blvd about 20 feet from shore in the water. The man didn't have identification documents with him and he left behind few clues as to who he might have been. The only notable detail was his t-shirt which bore an illustration of a little green man and the phrase "Nobody Freakin Cares".

In 2021, the Mississippi State Medical Examiner's office along with the D'iberville Police Department partnered with Othram to use genetic genealogy to identify the man. The funding and genealogical research was done by the same philanthropist who helped identify Meridian John Doe. On April 25, 2022, the man was identified as Dean Jeffrey. Research into his death is ongoing.

"Lincoln County John Doe (2006)"  
In 2006, human skeletal remains were found near a wood pile in Missouri. A forensic facial reconstruction was commissioned, but with few leads to pursue, the case went cold.

In 2021, the Lincoln County Sheriff's Office, the Lincoln County Coroners' Office, and Southeast Missouri State University coordinated with Othram, and used genetic genealogy to identify the man. Due to the condition of the remains at the time of their discovery, Lincoln County Coroner Dan Heavin, has said the cause of death remains undetermined, however there appears to be no signs of foul play or traumatic injury. The relatives of the deceased were contacted, and the remains released for burial. The family has asked that further details to be held in privacy, and local officials have agreed to honor this request.

Isabel Sanchez Bernal AKA "Mammoth Lakes Jane Doe"  
In 2003, skeletal remains were found in a shallow grave in CA. The victim's information was entered into NCIC and ViCAP. With few leads to work from, the case went cold.

In 2020, the Mono County Sheriff's Office teamed with Othram to use Forensic-Grade Genome Sequencing® to generate leads. Othram scientists produced a profile and an updated ancestry assessment of the victim. Othram used KinSNP™ familial testing to confirm a familial relationship identified during the investigation, which led to the discovery that the victim was Isabel Sanchez Bernal. Isabel came from Mexico City to Mammoth Lakes in 2002 and worked as a housekeeper in Mammoth Lakes. Several months later, her boyfriend, Diego Hernandez-Antonia, also arrived in Mammoth Lakes, where they stayed with extended family. In the fall of 2002, Diego and Isabel went for a walk however, only Diego returned. When questioned later by family members, Diego said that Isabel had left the area with someone else and provided a forged note from Isabel telling her extended family not to look for her.

On April 5, 2022, the Mono County Superior Court sentenced Diego Hernandez-Antonia to a term of 11 years in state prison for the voluntary manslaughter of Isabel Bernal-Sanchez, closing one of the longest “cold cases” in Mono County history.

Jimmy Mack Brooks AKA "Chatham County John Doe" 
On March 31, 1976, the dismembered remains of a male decedent were found in rural Moncure, North Carolina. Due to the lack of basic information about the man or any clues as to what had happened, the case quickly went cold. It was picked up by the NC Unidentified Project in 2020, who subsequently partnered up with Othram to build a genealogical profile of the decedent.

In May 2022, he was identified as 26-year-old Jimmy Mack Brooks, an unmarried Army veteran. Little is known about the circumstances of his disappearance and his supposed murder, which is currently under investigation.

Juanita Diane Roxy Coleman AKA "Hinds County Jane Doe" 
On March 13, 2018, the partially burned remains of a female decedent were found in a wooded area near Bolton, Mississippi. A definite cause of death could not be established, but investigators nonetheless deemed the death as "suspicious".

In May 2022, the woman was identified as 19-year-old Juanita Coleman, who had been missing since March 2016. For reasons unknown, her mother filed a missing persons report over four years later, on March 11, 2020. She also provided a DNA sample, which was instrumental for the identification itself. Authorities are currently conducting further investigation into her death.

Zachary Wells 
In January 2022, a fire broke out in a one-story home in southwest Atlanta. Firefighters from the Atlanta Fire Rescue Department responded to the scene where they worked to contain the heavy fire and smoke that had engulfed the home. Once the fire was contained, investigators assessed the damage and found one victim among the debris.

In the course of the investigation, a candidate family member volunteered to help rule out the possibility that the victim could be related to them and tested against the profile, using KinSNP® rapid familial testing. Investigators then confirmed that the victim of the fire was 59-year-old Zachary Wells, born and raised in Atlanta, GA.

Suzanne "Susan" Gale Poole AKA "Singer Island Jane Doe" 
In June 1974, deputies from the Palm Beach County Sheriff's Office discovered the skeletal remains of a young girl in a swampy area of Singer Island. The girl was tied up with wire to mangroves. She was described as a white female between the ages of 14 and 25. This decedent was estimated to be 4'11 to 5'2 tall and weighed about 83 to 103 pounds. Over the years many attempts were made to identify this girl including the creation of a DNA profile for CODIS  in 2015 and of a facial reconstruction in 2019, however all these efforts proved to be fruitless.

In December 2021, the Sheriff's Office sent the skeletal remains to Othram in order to perform genetic genealogy on them. In March 2022, Othram's in-house genealogy team sent investigate leads back to the agency. The Sheriff's Office used these leads to contact potential family members and collect DNA samples from them. On June 2, 2022, the girl was identified as 15-year-old Suzanne "Susan" Gale Poole of Fort Lauderdale who had been reported missing in 1972, right before Christmas. It is suspected that Poole is a potential victim of serial killer Gerald John Schaefer because several of his confirmed victims were also tied up in mangroves. Authorities are currently conducting further investigation into her murder.

Blaine Has Tricks AKA "Snohomish County John Doe (1977)" 
In September 1977, a bulldozer operator discovered human remains of a man in the Marysville Landfill. He was estimated to be a white male between the ages of 20 and 40, 5'6-5'8 tall, and 155-160 pounds with long black hair. Investigators determined that the man died about 2 weeks prior to his discovery. His remains were determined to have originated from business dumpsters in the downtown Seattle area. Several missing persons were ruled out by circumstances or dental records. DNA from the man's femur bone was extracted by the University of North Texas Health Sciences Center in September 2018. In March 2019, the DNA was uploaded to CODIS, but there were no matches.

In January 2021, a section of the man's femur bone was sent to Othram in order to extract DNA from it. In April 2021, Othram successfully extracted sufficient DNA for testing and proceeded to develop a DNA profile that could be uploaded to genealogical databases. The man was determined to be predominantly Native American through the DNA profile. The Snohomish County Medical Office were able to find a match through a grand niece level of the man's family tree. On June 16, 2022 the man was identified as Blaine Has Tricks, a member of the Standing Rock Sioux Tribe of North Dakota. Blaine was born on May 31, 1939 and was 38 years old at the time of his disappearance. He was last seen in 1977 when he boarded a train with his brother Clayton "Ross" Has Tricks bound for Spokane, Washington. Ross returned home to North Dakota, but Blaine was never heard from again and wasn't reported missing. Old newspaper records place Blaine in Spokane Washington around February 1977 and it's unknown when or how he came to Seattle. The investigation in his murder is ongoing.

Alice Lou Williams AKA "Beckler River Jane Doe (2009)" 
In October 2009, U.S Forest surveyors discovered the partial cranium of a woman in a steep forested ravine near Beckler Road north of Skykomish, Washington. She was estimated to be over 40 years old, but her race and other physical characteristics couldn't be determined due to the scant amount of skeletal remains found and the incomplete cranium. The woman was determined to have died at least one year to several decades prior to being discovered. Her death was classified as suspicious due to the presence of trauma and the location where the cranium was found. In March 2010, a small portion of the woman's cranium was sent to the FBI in Quantico, Virginia for DNA extraction in order to upload it to CODIS. The FBI managed to obtain mtDNA and STR samples both of which were uploaded to CODIS, but no matches were found there. Over the years, the STR profile was used to rule out several missing women.  The DNA Doe Project and DNA Solutions attempted to extract DNA in 2017 and 2019 respectively, however all efforts were.unsuccessful either due to contamination or DNA samples being insufficient for testing.

In June 2021, Othram was contacted to perform genetic genealogy on the woman's cranium. In March 2022, Othram managed to obtain a DNA sample that was sufficient enough for a DNA profile. The Snohomish County Medical Office uploaded the DNA profile and found multiple close matches. On June 16, 2022, the woman was identified as Alice Lou Williams. Missing person reports filed in Snohomish County show that Williams disappeared under suspicious circumstances in July 1981 from her recreational cabin at Lake Loma located five miles northwest of Marysville, Washington. The investigation into her death is ongoing.

"Columbia Baby Doe" 
In 2019, an infant in an advanced state of decomposition was found in Columbia, Missouri. Though many leads were investigated, the identity of the infant remained unknown. In 2020, Columbia Police Department partnered with Othram to develop new leads that might help identify the infant. DNASolves crowdfunding helped cover the cost of testing for the case. Othram buit a profile for the infant. During genealogical research, Columbia PD received a tip that led to the identification of the infant and her parents.

Joyce Marilyn Meyer Sommers AKA "Christmas Tree Lady" 

In December 1996, a groundskeeper at Pleasant Valley Memorial Park Cemetery in Annandale, Virginia found a woman's body. She was found in a section designated for infant burials, but wasn't near a particular grave. The woman was estimated to be a white female with red or copper hair between the ages of 50–70 years old and was approximately 5 feet tall. The woman was found with a plastic bag over her head, along with two fifty dollar bills, one for the coroner and one for the cemetery. A note was found with her body that stated: "Deceased by own hand...prefer no autopsy. Please order cremation with funds provided. Thank you. Jane Doe". The woman's autopsy report showed that she had alcohol and valium in her system when she died. Investigators suspected that the woman committed suicide and the official cause of death was determined to be suffocation. She was given the name of "Christmas Tree Lady" because of a small 8 inch Christmas tree that was found next to her.

Over the years, numerous missing person reports from the National Capital Region were compared to the decedent's physical description, but no matches were found. A colorized sketch of the decedent was made in 2000 in hopes that a friend or family member would recognize her, but no leads were produced. In January 2022, detectives of the Fairfax County Police Department sent physical evidence to Othram where its scientists created a genealogical profile for the decedent. In May 2022, investigative leads were returned to the detectives who used them to find a suspected family member which led to more family connections across the country. A DNA sample from a close relative confirmed a match eventually leading to the decedent's siblings.

On July 7, 2022, the "Christmas Tree Lady" was formally identified as 69-year-old Joyce Marilyn Meyer Sommers. Meyer was born in July 1927, the eldest of 5 siblings and was raised on a farm outside of Davenport, Iowa. Family members believe she moved to Virginia sometime after the mid-1980's. Meyer wasn't reported missing at the time of her death, but family members spent years looking for her and even hired a private detective at one point. It was determined that Meyer never had children.

Gary Lee White AKA "Biloxi John Doe (2019)" 
In September 2019, human remains were found on the roof an abandoned building in downtown Biloxi, Mississippi near the 800 block of Barthes Street. The decedent had no identification with him and investigators were unable to find a missing person's report that matched the decedent's physical description. In August 2021, the Mississippi State Medical Examiner's Office, Biloxi Police Department, and the Harrison County Coroner's Office partnered with Othram to perform genetic genealogy. Othram built a genealogical profile from the remains and passed investigative leads back to law enforcement. On July 20, 2022, the decedent was identified as Gary Lee White from Jackson, Mississippi thanks to additional investigation by Biloxi investigators. He was born on August 29, 1952 and would have been 67 years old at the time of his discovery. The investigation into the circumstances of White's death is ongoing.

Samuel Boucher AKA "Biloxi John Doe (2017)" 
In October 2017, just hours prior to the landfall from Hurricane Nate, a group of boaters found human remains near the Tchoutacabouffa River near Biloxi, Mississippi. Despite the fact that a wallet and driver's license belonging to a man recently reported missing by his family were found next to the body, coroners were reluctant to connect the two cases. After teaming up with Othram, the Harrison County Coroner's Office positively identified the decedent as 40-year-old Samuel C. Boucher. The exact cause of death has not been established.

Kathryn Coffey AKA "Riverside Jane Doe (1991)" 
On January 22, 1991, human bones were found in the desert near Thermal, California. Authorities were unable to determine how long they had been there, how exactly she had died or who the decedent was. On August 23, 2022, the local police department announced that they had identified the remains as belonging to 36-year-old Kathryn Coffey of Baldwin Park, who was last seen in Indio in either 1989 or 1990. The match was made via DNA obtained from her sister, and as Coffey's death is considered suspicious in nature, investigators are seeking for any leads to resolve it.

Arthur Winters AKA "Hinds County John Doe (2018)" 
In February 2018, the Fire Department in Jackson, Mississippi were alerted that a fire had broken out at a rooming house. After extinguishing the fire, the firefighters found burned human remains, but were unable to identify to whom they belonged to. Although the decedent is believed to have succumbed to smoke inhalation, his death is still under investigation. In August 2022, Othram identified the remains as those of 59-year-old Arthur Winters, who had been reported missing by his family circa June 2017.

Tracy Walker AKA "Elk Valley Jane Doe/Baby Girl" 

On April 3, 1985, the skeletonised partial remains of a young girl were discovered about 200 yards off Big Wheel Gap Road, four miles southwest of Jellico, Tennessee in Campbell County near a strip mine. She was believed to have been dead between one and four years. Her age was estimated between 9 and 15. She was found by a passerby.

On August 30, 2022, she was identified as 15-year-old Tracy Sue Walker of Lafayette, Indiana. The connection was made after Othram Laboratories located a possible family member in the Lafayette area and TBI intelligence analysts located several relatives there, who confirmed they had a relative who disappeared in 1978. DNA samples were taken and submitted to CODIS, from with the UNTCHI identified Walker's remains.

John Glatzel AKA "Harris County John Doe (1982)" 
On July 6, 1982, bones and clothing belonging to what appeared to be a young male were found in a field near Schurmier Road in Houston, Texas. A subsequent autopsy determined that the victim had likely been strangled to death, but due to the lack of clues and no missing persons reports matching the decedent's description, the case quickly went cold.

In August 2021, the Houston Police Department reopened the case and submitted it to Othram, who eventually tracked down the decedent's younger sister, who now lives in Indiana. Through her familial DNA, the victim was identified as 18-year-old John Howard Gletzel, but the circumstances of his disappearance and murder remain unclear and are under investigation.

Ralph Tufano AKA "Alachua County John Doe (1979)" 
On February 13, 1979, an employee of the Florida Forest Service working in High Springs found what appeared to be a human skeleton. Aside from clothing and a rope with a knot, there was no means of identification left behind. Since 1982, multiple forensic experts and several institutions, including the DNA Doe Project, had attempted to identify the decedent but were unable to do so due to complications with locating a suitable DNA profile.

The case was eventually handed over to Othram, which managed to locate a second or fourth cousin of the decedent via genome sequencing. On September 19, 2022, he was finally identified as 35-year-old Ralph Tufano, who had gone missing from New York in 1976. It is unclear how and why he ended up in Florida, and his death is currently under investigation.

"Harriman State Park Jane Doe (1984)" 
On Mother's Day 1984, the skeletal remains of a murdered woman were discovered by a hiker in a densely wooded, swampy area in the Orange County section of New York's Harriman State Park. The murder victim was a white woman presumed to be in her late 30's, with natural gray hair and traces of blonde or brunette dye. She was about 5' tall and there was evidence of extensive dental work.

In March 2021, as part of a collaboration between the New York State Police (NYSP) and the FBI, forensic evidence from the unknown woman was sent to Othram. In September 2022, additional DNA testing with a possible family member confirmed the woman’s identity. Investigators have not yet released the name or photo of the murdered woman because a homicide investigation is currently in process.

Anne Papalardo-Blake AKA "Dutchess County Jane Doe (1980)" 
On March 20, 1980, troopers from the New York State Police received an anonymous tip that a suspicious trunk had been found near a dumpster at an apartment complex in Fishkill, New York. Upon inspecting its contents, they found the body of a woman, which notably lacked a head and both hands. Authorities were able to ascertain through stickers placed on the trunk that its owner had likely traveled to France from 1958 to 1960, and that said owner was a woman by the name of June Leaf. However, Leaf was ruled out as the decedent, and since they had no further leads to go on, the case went cold.

The case was eventually given to Othram, and in September 2022, they identified the decedent as 44-year-old Anne Papalardo-Blake. A receptionist working at a beauty salon in Manhattan, Papalardo-Blake was reported missing two days prior to her body being discovered, but the circumstances of her disappearance and subsequent murder are currently under investigation.

Patricia "Choubi" Gildawie AKA "Fairfax County Jane Doe (2001)" 
On September 27, 2001, a construction crew working behind an apartment complex in Tysons, Virginia uncovered what appeared to be human remains. Initially misidentified as belonging to a black female, an anthropologist suspected at the time that the remains had been placed there no less than two years prior to discovery. The victim had apparently been shot in the head.

In early 2022, the local police department asked Othram to help identify the decedent. In September, they positively identified her as 17-year-old Patricia "Choubi" Gildawie, a French-born teenager who had gone missing in February 1975 - thus contradicting previous speculation about her race and timespan of death. Investigation into her murder is ongoing.

Joan Marie Dymond AKA "Luzerne County Jane Doe (2012)" 
On November 12, 2012, several people searching for scrap metal near Newport Township, Pennsylvania found a human skull and some teeth. These were then sent to a forensic odontologist and the University of Texas for testing, but were unable to identify the decedent.

On September 16, 2022, Othram identified the remains as those of 14-year-old Joan "Joanie" Marie Dymond, who vanished from her home in Wilkes-Barre on June 25, 1969. Contemporary inquiries searched for the teenager in Atlantic City, New Jersey and New York City, but nothing turned up and her case went cold. Due to the circumstances her remains were found in, police suspect that she could have been a homicide victim and are investigating further.

Donald Rozek AKA "Will County John Doe (1974)" 
On November 9, 1974, the skeletal remains of an unidentified man were found in a creek bed near Channahon, Illinois by three hunters. As there was no identification present, efforts to identify the remains were stalled and numerous potential candidates ruled out, even after they exhumed for additional analysis in 1993. In June 2021, the local coroner's office contacted Othram to assist with the case.

With their assistance, distant relatives were found in several states, and eventually led to the identification of the decedent as Donald M. Rozek, a possible Army veteran from Harvey. His cause of death is undetermined and remains under investigation.

Doreen Tiedman AKA "Hancock County Jane Doe (1994)" 
On October 18, 1994, the remains of a white woman were found under a bridge in a wooded area of Greenfield, Indiana. Investigators determined that the body had likely been there for several months, but as she had no identification on her, they were unable to determine who she was. The case went cold over the years, before it was eventually handed over to Othram in August 2021.

On October 12, 2022, the decedent was identified as 34-year-old Doreen M. Tiedman, a hitchhiker from Cleveland, Ohio who was known to frequently travel around the country. Her cause of deaths remains undetermined, and investigators seek anybody with possible information on her activities to contact law enforcement.

Cynthia Gunnerson AKA "Twin Falls County Jane Doe" 
On September 9, 2014, the body of a woman was found floating in the Snake River under a bridge near Twin Falls, Idaho. The coroners who examined the body determined that the decedent had likely committed suicide, but were unable to positively identify her. The case thus remained dormant until 2020, when it handed over to Othram.

On October 12, 2022, Othram revealed that they had identified the woman as Cynthia Gunnerson, also known by the alias Sasha Ergateage, who was originally from San Francisco, California. The exact circumstances that led to her suicide have not been released per the family members' request.

Steven Gabbard AKA "Monroe County John Doe (2004)" 
On May 2, 2004, a turkey hunter hunting near Lake Lemon, located northeast of Bloomington, Indiana, found what appeared to be partial human skeletal remains. The finding was reported to the local authorities, who quickly deduced that the remains belonged to male who had been shot to death by an unknown assailant. However, due to lack of personal identification and no clues to his identity, the case went unsolved.

In October 2022, Othram identified the decedent as 39-year-old Steven Gabbard, a resident of Louisville, Kentucky who was reported missing by his family in June 2002. He was last seen in Indianapolis, but research into the circumstances of his death and subsequent murder is ongoing.

Patricia Campbell AKA "Oneida Jane Doe (1986)" 
On October 26, 1986, a hunter discovered a partial human skull in an area near Malad, Idaho. Due to the fact that two girls, 15-year-old Patricia Campbell and 12-year-old Tina Anderson, had gone missing from Pocatello and some of their remains were later found in the area, authorities suspected that this could be a possible additional victim. A contemporary theory suggested that the victim might have been mixed-race.

In October 2022, Othram confirmed that the skull belonged to Campbell. Investigation into her murder is ongoing.

William P. Leech AKA "Jackson County John Doe (1996)" 
On June 16, 1996, the skeletal remains of an unknown man were found in a wooded area of Moss Point, Mississippi. As there was no ID or easily identifiable items, authorities were unable to identify the man and he was buried as a John Doe.

In October 2022, using DNA extracted from the decedent's exhumed body, the geneticists at Othram identified him as 47-year-old William P. Leech of Panama City, Florida. Little is currently known regarding the circumstances of his disappearance and death, which is under investigation.

Fred James "Jamie" Grow AKA "Benton County John Doe (1981)" 
On June 13, 1981, the body of a man was found near U.S. Route 62, about a mile east of Garfield, Arkansas, having been hidden under some underbrush. The victim had been shot four times execution-style and then dumped at the location, but authorities at the time were unable to identify who he was.

On October 25, 2022, the man was identified as 33-year-old Fred James "Jamie" Grow, a resident of Fayetteville who had gone missing ten days prior to his body's discovery while on a trip to visit family in Colorado. The case is currently under active investigation and authorities claim that there is a suspect who is yet to be charged. This case was one of three submitted to Othram by Lt. Hunter Petray from Benton County Sheriff's Office, which Othram has all identified and released their identities on the same date.

John Douglas Rollins Jr. AKA "Benton County John Doe (1996)" 
On October 16, 1996, the body of a man was found rolled up in a sleeping bag near Beaver Lake, not far from Rogers, Arkansas. Bruises on the man's body indicated that he had been beaten to death, but investigators were unable to determine neither his or his killer's identity.

On October 25, 2022, the decedent was identified as 31-year-old John Douglas Rollins Jr., who had gone missing circa the mid-1990s but no police report was ever filed in his case. His murder remains under investigation. This case was one of three submitted to Othram by Lt. Hunter Petray from Benton County Sheriff's Office, which Othram has all identified and released their identities on the same date.

Donna Nelton AKA "Benton County Jane Doe (1990)" 
On May 7, 1990, the burned remains of an unknown female were discovered along Arkansas Highway 102 near Maysville, Arkansas. The cause of death was determined to be a gunshot wound and that the victim had been set on fire post-mortem, but despite multiple facial reconstructions, police were unable to identify her.

On October 25, 2022, Othram identified her as 28-year-old Donna Sue Nelton, who had gone missing sometime during the fall of 1989, after her DNA was matched to a relative. Along with her identification, sheriffs from Benton County announced that Nelton's then-boyfriend, drug dealer and former FBI Ten Most Wanted Fugitive George Alvin Bruton, was identified as her most likely killer. According to them, this stemmed from the fact that he and an associate were seen disposing of several black trash bags in North Kansas City, Missouri, later determined to be personal items belonging to Nelson, and that Bruton had confessed to killing a woman named 'Donna' in July 1990 because he feared she would expose his drug and theft operations. Bruton died behind bars in 2008, while serving a life term for drug-related offences, and the case is now considered closed. This case was one of three submitted to Othram by Lt. Hunter Petray from Benton County Sheriff's Office, which Othram has all identified and released their identities on the same date.

Everette Guy Travis AKA "Cape Girardeau John Doe (1981)" 
On April 6, 1981, a mushroom hunter found human skeletal remains in the woods of Cape Girardeau, Missouri, which he immediately reported to the police. Approximately seven years later, that same mushroom hunter found a skull not far away from the where he had originally found the skeletal remains. Believing this to belong to the same victim, authorities attempted to unsuccessfully identify the decedent over the years, but were without success.

On October 26, 2022, Othram announced that they had used a DNA match from a relative to identify the remains and that they belonged to 26-year-old Everette Guy Travis. He had gone missing from Blytheville, Arkansas in June 1977, and while Travis' body was not found at the time, it was determined that he had been killed by Kenneth Derringer, a hitchhiker he had picked up. Derringer was convicted and died behind bars for the murder in 2012.

Ruth Marie Terry AKA "Lady of the Dunes" 

In 1974, the decomposing body of a woman was found in Massachusetts. The victim’s hands were missing, and her head was nearly severed from her body. She became known as "Lady of the Dunes".

In 2022, skeletal remains were sent to Othram. Despite DNA damage from formaldehyde and other chemicals, a comprehensive DNA profile was built using Forensic-Grade Genome Sequencing®, which was returned to FBI investigators. After discovering a close relative, the FBI were able to confirm that Lady of the Dunes was Ruth Marie Terry.

Otie Ames AKA "Stilly Doe" 
On July 23, 1980, the body of a man was found floating in the Stillaguamish River near Arlington, Washington by a fly fisherman. The cause of death was determined to be drowning, but coroners were unable to identify the man. Multiple reconstructions of his possible appearance were made over the years, all of which portrayed him as either Native American or of East Indian descent.

Using DNA extracted from the body, Othram managed to identify the decedent on November 10, 2022 - his name was Othaniel "Otie" Phillip Ames, a dairy farm worker who had settled in Arlington with his family in 1951. He was last known to be alive in early 1980, when he had informed relatives that he planned to visit some relatives in California and Oregon. Contrary to what was previously believed, he was of Northern European and Mediterranean descent.

Roger Ellis AKA "Carbon County John Doe (2004)" 
On June 20, 2004, a hiker hiking near Red Lodge, Montana found what appeared to be a human skull. The finding was reported to the authorities, who located additional bones upon searching the area. Forensic analysis determined that they belonged to a single male individual aged 15 to 32, but were not unable to determine who exactly it was.

After submitting it to various agencies and eventually to Othram, the decedent was identified as 22-year-old Rogers "Roger" Lee Ellis of Wisconsin Dells, Wisconsin. He was last seen in December 1976, when he was facing legal issues for marijuana possession in his home state. He supposedly hitchhiked out of Wisconsin in an attempt to avoid arrest, but was likely killed by whoever had picked him up. Ellis' murder is under investigation.

Sharon Abbott Lane AKA "Fairfax County Jane Doe" 
On December 6, 1993, a land surveyor found the skeletal remains of a woman in a shallow grave located in the woods near Centreville, Virginia. The coroner concluded that she had been stabbed to death approximately one to six years prior, but were unable to establish who she was. Multiple attempts were made to identify her over the years, but none were successful.

Using DNA extracted from the body, Othram located a cousin and later a brother of the victim, who was ultimately identified as 28-year-old Sharon Kay Abbott Lane. She went missing sometime during the mid-1980s, and investigation into her murder is ongoing.

Kenneth Williams AKA "Long Beach John Doe (1978)" 
On June 3, 1978, the body of a teenage male was found at an intersection of Long Beach, California. The decedent had been strangled, and due to the position his body was found in, authorities theorized that he was either killed on the spot or his body was dumped there.

With the help of Othram, the victim was identified as 15-year-old Kenneth Nevada Williams, a runaway from La Puente who had never been reported missing. The exact date of his disappearance and likely murder has thus far not been established, and authorities are continuing the search for his killer(s). Othram was also able to rule him out as a potential victim of serial killer Randy Kraft, who had long been suspected of involvement in this case.

Larry Dean Watts AKA "Mesa County John Doe (2019)" 
On December 13, 2019, a hunting guide discovered the skeletal remains of what appeared to be an adult male at an overlook near Gateway, Colorado. Due to the lack of personal items and any easily identifiable features, coroners were unable to determine the decedent's cause of death.

On December 16, 2022, with the help of Othram, the Mesa County Coroner's Office identified the man as 48-year-old Larry Dean Watts, who was last seen with his brother in Grand Junction on June 16, 1997. The exact cause and circumstances surrounding his death are under investigation.

Linda Bennett AKA "Owen County Jane Doe" 
In 1988, the body of an unknown woman was found in Owenton, Kentucky. Multiple traditional identification methods failed to produce leads.

In 2022, the Kentucky State Police teamed with Othram to help establish leads. Othram's forensic scientists developed a DNA extract and used Forensic-Grade Genome Sequencing® to build a DNA profile. Othram genealogists used forensic genetic genealogy to produce leads that were returned to investigators, which resulted in the identification of the victim as Linda Bennett.

Michael West AKA "Mississippi John Doe (2017)" 
In 2017, a human skull found in Pearl, Mississippi was submitted to the State Medical Examiner's Office. No information was provided about the circumstances of the discovery, and thus little leads were available for the case.

The Medical Examiner's Office eventually partnered up with Othram to identify the decedent, and in December 2022, he was successfully identified as Michael Len West, a native of Wichita County, Texas. No photographs of him have been located, and it is unclear how or when West came to Mississippi, or how exactly he died.

2023

Daisy Heath AKA "Yakima County Jane Doe (2008)"
On November 26, 2008, a partial human skull was found in a remote area near White Swan, Washington. Authorities attempted to establish the decedent's identity through traditional forensic testing methods, but no usable DNA profile was located.

On January 4, 2023, Othram helped identify the Doe as 29-year-old Daisy Mae Heath, also known as Daisy Mae Tallman, a Yakama woman who went missing from Toppenish on August 30, 1987. Her cause of death is currently under investigation, but agencies like the FBI believe that she may have been murdered, as other Native American woman have either been killed or disappeared in the surrounding area at the time.

Amore Wiggins AKA "Opelika Jane Doe" 

On January 28, 2012, the skull of a young girl was found in a trailer park in Opelika, Alabama, with additional bones and clothing being found in an adjacent lot. Analysis of the remains determined that they belonged to a young black girl who had likely been malnourished and physically abused while still alive.

On January 19, 2023, Othram identified the decedent as 6-year-old Amore Joveah Wiggins, the daughter of Navy officer Lamar Vickerstaff Jr. and Sherry Wiggins. According to Wiggins, Vickerstaff obtained legal custody of their daughter in 2009 and moved in with his current wife, Ruth, and she never heard from her daughter again. Both of the Vickerstaffs were arrested after the identification, with Lamar facing felony murder charges while Ruth is facing failure to report a missing child.

Linda McClure AKA "Somerset Jane Doe"
On October 22, 1987, a fatal vehicle collision occurred on the Pennsylvania Turnpike near Stonycreek Township, Somerset County, Pennsylvania when a tractor trailer collided with another trailer, hitting the latter's fuel tank. Two people were killed in the process: the 57-year-old driver, Edward Pratt of Fontana, California, and an unidentified female passenger he had possibly picked up.

On January 24, 2023, Othram managed to identify the passenger as 26-year-old Linda Jean McClure of Indiana, Pennsylvania. She was last in contact with her family in the late 1980s and was later reported missing.

Colleen Rice AKA "Mohave County Jane Doe"
On January 23, 1971, a canvas sack containing the body of a woman was found on the grounds of a private ranch in Kingman, Arizona. Although coroners were able to give approximations of what she looked like, they were unable to identify her and attempts to establish her identity at the time were unsuccessful.

On January 24, 2023, Othram, in conjunction with the MCSO Cold Case team, managed to identify the decedent as 39-year-old Colleen Audrey Rice of Portsmouth, Ohio. Much about her life is currently unknown, including how and why she came to Arizona. Her exact manner of death has not been revealed, but is considered homicidal in nature and is under active investigation.

Richard Alt AKA "Bucks County John Doe (1986)"
In June 1986, a fisherman fishing along the Delaware River near Morrisville, Pennsylvania found a human skull. He took the skull to the police department in Buckingham Township, but the authorities were unable to link any missing persons cases to it.

After remaining dormant for many years, the skull was turned over to Othram in September 2022. In January 2023, it was identified as belonging to 31-year-old Richard Thomas Alt, a resident of Trenton, New Jersey, who disappeared along with his girlfriend in the mid-1980s. Her body was found in April 1985 along the Delaware River, and both are believed to be homicide victims.

Mary Cowan AKA "Newton Jane Doe" 
On May 14, 1985, a woman was found injured on the side of a road near Newton, Georgia. She was driven to a hospital in Albany, where she succumbed to her injuries on June 1. Medical staff were unable to ascertain her identity, but concluded that her injuries were caused from a fall from the back of a truck.

In January 2023, Othram utilized a DNA sample extracted from her bone marrow to identify the decedent as 28-year-old Mary Ann Cowan of Florida. The identification was made possible through a familial match to one of her children.

Jade Feigert AKA "Cowlitz County John Doe" 
On February 22, 2020, a nearly complete human skeleton was found near a dock in Longview, Washington. It was sent to the local coroner's office, but they were unable to identify to whom it belonged to or what the cause of death was.

In February 2023, Othram identified the man as 22-year-old Jade David Feigert of Columbia County, Oregon, who went missing in 2017. He was last seen in Kelso, where he was dropped off by his mother - his death is not considered suspicious and the case is now officially closed.

David West Jr AKA "Sherman County John Doe (1989)" 
On March 26, 1989, the skeletal remains of an unknown man were found washed ashore of the John Day River near Moro, Oregon. Despite local interest, coroners were unable to identify the decedent with certainty.

In February 2023, Othram helped identify the decedent as David West Jr, a 73-year-old local who supposedly died during a flood in 1964. His death is not considered suspicious, and is now closed.

Jerilyn Smith AKA "Port Angeles foot" 
In December 2021, a human foot was discovered floating in the river near Port Angeles, Washington, with subsequent searches revealing a shoe. Authorities were only able to confirm that it belonged to a woman, but had no clue as to whose body the foot belonged to.

On February 21, 2023, Othram linked the foot to the remains of 68-year-old Jerilyn Smith, who was reported missing from Sequim after she apparently jumped into the Elwha River.

Amanda Schumann-Deza AKA "San Joaquin Jane Doe/Lady in the Fridge" 
On March 29, 1995, an individual recycling in Holt, California discovered a partially submerged refrigerator in an irrigation canal off Bacon Island Road. Inside the refrigerator was the heavily decomposed body of a woman. Investigators believe she was entombed underwater in the fridge for several months. They also determined that the woman was Caucasian with strawberry blonde hair, 110 to 130 pounds, with an approximate age of 29 to 41. There were obvious signs of injury to the woman's body and her death was ruled a homicide. 

On February 23, 2023, Othram identified the woman as 29-year-old Amanda Lynn Schumann-Deza. Schumann-Deza was separated from her husband and had three children at the time of her disappearance. She was last seen at an unknown apartment complex in Napa, California with an unidentified male she met in a rehabilitation facility. Investigators believe Schumann-Deza might be a victim of serial killer Terry Peder Rasmussen due to the presence of a unique milk brand in the fridge that was only delivered to a certain area where Rasmussen lived at the time. Schumann Deza's body bore the hallmarks of his other victims- she had died of blunt force trauma and put in a container which was then tied off and dumped.

Robert Sanders AKA "Youngstown John Doe" 
On September 11, 1987, a man and his grandson went hunting for squirrels near Youngstown, Ohio, when they found a human skull and bones. The remains were sent to the Youngstown State University's anthropological department, but were not examined until August 2021, when a former student contacted police about them. Othram then took up the case, with a fund given by The Porchlight Project to help with the funding.

On February 27, 2023, the decedent was identified as 22-year-old Robert Earl Sanders. He was reported missing by his mother in 1976, but how he died and what led to his death is currently unknown. His identification was announced alongside that of Theodore Long, a 19-year-old man who went missing from Toledo in 1981 and whose remains were fished out of a creek that same year.

Jimmy Medlock AKA "Fayette County John Doe" 
On February 17, 2022, the body of a man, all wrapped up in plastic, was found abandoned near a dumpster in Lexington, Kentucky. The man had been stabbed in the heart, but police were initially unable to identify him.

On March 1, 2023, with the help of Othram, the decedent was identified as 40-year-old Jimmy Lawrence Medlock, who disappeared circa September 2021. Following his identification, 35-year-old Jennifer Kashuba was arrested for his murder and is now charged with murder, mistreatment of a corpse and falsifying physical evidence.

Gary Haynie AKA "Spencer Island John Doe" 
On January 3, 1979, a duck hunter found what appeared to be human remains off the coast of Spencer Island, near Marysville, Washington. Cause of death could not be determined, and the decedent was buried as a John Doe. The case gained traction again around 2016, after a forensic artist made a sketch of what the man could have looked like when alive.

On March 2, 2023, Othram identified the decedent as 29-year-old Gary Lee Haynie, a resident of Everett who went missing during the 1970s. The circumstances surrounding his disappearance and subsequent death are currently unknown.

Jeffery Sydow AKA "Humboldt County John Doe (1998)" 
On March 27, 1993, two residents of Loleta, California were searching for driftwood in the Eel River when they found the body of a man floating in the water. Authorities were notified, and after an autopsy was conducted, it was determined that the man had likely drowned. However, with no identification on him, they were unable to determine who he was.

In December 2022, Othram partnered up with the Humboldt County Sheriff's Office and the California DOJ to extract DNA from the man. Using this, they linked his profile to the sister of 35-year-old Jeffery Todd Sydow, who ceased contact with his family in the mid-1990s. The DOJ managed to obtain a latent fingerprint of Sydow, establishing with certainty that he was the decedent in question.

Marie O'Brien AKA "Will County Jane Doe (1997)" 
On May 13, 1997, the skeletal remains of a young woman were found in an abandoned building in Joliet, Illinois. The building was frequented by transients and criminals, and after suffering from a fire in 1992, it was ordered to be demolished. It's unknown when the woman died there, or what her cause of death was.

On March 3, 2023, Othram identified the remains as those of Marie R. O'Brien, a young woman from Aurora who lost contact with her family in 1984. The circumstances surrounding her death remain unclear.

Biloxi Jane Doe (2021) 
Sometime in 2021, the skull of an unknown female was discovered in the Gulf of Mexico in Biloxi, Mississippi. A commercial diver had found the skull while cutting old support beams in the water from a casino site that was destroyed by Hurricane Katrina. An anthropological examination of the skull determined that the decedent was 17-18 years old when she died. 

On March 4, 2023, Othram identified the decedent as a 17-year-old high school senior from Clinton, Mississippi. The young woman was killed in a car accident on January 3, 2000 and was laid to rest in a mausoleum at Southern Memorial Park. a water front cemetery, in Biloxi. In August 2005, Hurricane Katrina's winds and storm surge overturned and broke many of the graves, exposing and displacing 50 caskets including that of the decedent.

Manly Bacon AKA "Ward County John Doe (2022)" 
On October 1, 2022, the body of a man was found down a steep ravine near Minot, North Dakota. Coroners ruled out foul play, but were unable to determine how exactly the man had died.

On March 6, 2023, Othram revealed the man's identity as 63-year-old Manly Bacon. It was established that he died roughly six weeks prior to his body's discovery, but the cause of death remains unclear.

Patricia Ann Tucker AKA "Granby Girl (1978)" 
In November 1978, the remains of a woman were discovered buried under leaves on a logging road off Amherst Road in Granby, Massachusetts. At the time of her discovery, investigators could make very few estimates on the woman's physical description and appearance. The Office of the Chief Medical Examiner determined that she had been dead since June of 1978 and that the cause of death was a bullet wound to the temple thus her death was a homicide. The woman was also determined to be between the ages of 19-27 years old.

On March 6, 2023, Othram identified Granby Girl as 28-year-old Patricia Ann Tucker of East Hampton, Connecticut. Tucker was last seen by her then 5-year-old son when she and her third husband, Gerald Coleman, dropped him off at a home owned by a woman named Laura Holmes in Chicopee in August of 1978. The couple asked Holmes to supervise Tucker's son for a few hours, but they never returned. After a few days, Holmes eventually called the police and Tucker's son was reunited with his birth father who raised him. 

Gerald Coleman never reported his wife missing. He had a violent criminal history having been arrested in 1968 for attempted kidnapping and carrying a firearm. Coleman was convicted in 1995 of rape, assault, and battery and was incarcerated in a Massachusetts prison where he died in 1996. Police consider him a strong person of interest in Tucker's murder.

Etus Romero AKA "Mesa County John Doe (1992)" 
On November 28, 1992, human remains were found in a wildlife reserve near Orchard Mesa, Colorado. Although the remains were decomposed and lacked a skull, coroners determined that the man had been stabbed to death. Multiple previous attempts to identify the decedent were unsuccessful, but in September 2022, Othram was contacted to help with the case.

DNA testing led to a sibling of the unknown man, and in March 2023, he was identified as 26-year-old Etus Thomas "ET" Romero of New Iberia, Louisiana. A military veteran who was residing in nearby Grand Junction - where he worked as a dishwasher - he traveled to the area with two unknown individuals in October 1991. Authorities believe he was murdered sometime during the summer of 1992, and are currently looking for any information that could help solve the murder.

References

External links 
 Othram website
 DNASolves website

American companies established in 2018
Companies based in The Woodlands, Texas
Forensics organizations